Holzgauer Wetterspitze is a mountain in the Lechtal Alps of Tyrol, Austria.

The mountain consists primarily of limestone from the Upper Triassic period.

References

Mountains of the Alps
Mountains of Tyrol (state)
Lechtal Alps